U to U, sometimes labeled as U-2-U, is a weekly Nickelodeon television series that aired from 1994 to 1996. The show focused on displaying viewer-submitted work and ideas in their "Straight From U" segment where viewers were able to submit their work via mail, e-mail, fax, or telephone.

The show included short stories and comic strips written by viewers that were turned into animated shorts, and songs that were written and made into music videos. The interaction of series allowed viewers to play games over the phone, ask questions to celebrities, meet pen pals from other countries, and read letters aloud.

The show also featured an online presence in the Prodigy Internet service where viewers could create and send content for show consideration as well as participate in bulletin board conversations.

References

External links

1990s American children's television series
1990s Nickelodeon original programming
1994 American television series debuts
1996 American television series endings